TNW may refer to:

Tactical nuclear weapon, a nuclear weapon which is designed to be used on a battlefield in military situations
Tonsawang language (ISO 639 code: tnw)
Trans Nation Airways (ICAO airline code: TNW) Ethiopian airline
Jumandy Airport (IATA airport code: TNW) in Tena, Napo Province, Ecuador
Mayor Galo de la Torre Airport (IATA airport code: TNW) defunct airport in Tena, Napo Province, Ecuador
Tin Creek Airport (FAA airport code: TNW) in Farewell Lake, Alaska, USA; see List of airports in Alaska
Warsaw Scientific Society (Polish: Towarzystwo Naukowe Warszawskie) aka "TNW"
Tarifverbund Nordwestschweiz, Swiss public transit tariff network
 Latin-script trigraph (tnw) for Arrernte, see List of Latin-script trigraphs
Team Ninja Warrior, U.S. TV series based on SASUKE/Ninja Warrior telesport
The Next Web, a website